Heaton is an unincorporated community in Wells County, North Dakota, United States. It is located 20 miles west of Carrington. Heaton was heavily damaged by a tornado in 1907 and some blame the decline of the town on that event.

Anti-government tax protester Gordon Kahl was born in Heaton.

Starting in the late 1990s, and picking up speed in the mid-late 2000s, all remaining abandoned buildings on the townsite have been demolished, one by one. The reason is said to be because many of the properties were forfeited to the county due to unpaid property taxes, and Speedwell township took over and razed many of the properties due to health hazards. The former gas station was purchased and turned into a meat processing business, Miller Game Processing. As of 2016, the town population was 1.

References 

Geography of Wells County, North Dakota
Ghost towns in North Dakota
Unincorporated communities in Wells County, North Dakota
Unincorporated communities in North Dakota